Fusiturris torta is a species of sea snail, a marine gastropod mollusk in the family Fusiturridae.

Description

(Translation of the original French description) The slightly shiny shell is solid and has an elongated fusiform shape. The turreted spire is composed of 9 very convex whorls, subcarinated on their extremes. They are separated by a very marked oblique suture, covered with sigmoid growth lines, fine decurrent striae and large, wide and nodular oblique longitudinal folds, numbering 6 on each of the last two whorls. The body whorl measures half of the total height of the shell. It finishes in a long, narrow and slightly twisted siphonal canal. The elongated aperture is angular at the top. The columella is sinuated at the top, then a little oblique. The simple outer lip is sharp. The color of the aperture is a dirty, uniform white, but is slightly tinged with red on the end of the siphonal canal. The ground color of the shell is a white uniform ivory.

Distribution
This species occurs in the Atlantic Ocean between Gabon and Angola.

References

 Dautzenberg, P., 1912. Mission GRUVEL sur la côte occidentale d'Afrique (1909-1910), Mollusques marins. Annales de l'Institut Océanographique "1913"5(3): 111 p, 3 pls

Bibliography

 Bernard, P.A. (Ed.) (1984). Coquillages du Gabon [Shells of Gabon]. Pierre A. Bernard: Libreville, Gabon. 140, 75 plates pp.

External links
 
 Holotype at MNHN, Paris

torta
Gastropods described in 1912